Salzigutovo (Salyoğot) is a rural locality (a village) in Bolsheustyikinsky Selsoviet, Mechetlinsky District, Bashkortostan, Russia. The population was 266 as of 2010. There are 9 streets.

Geography 
Salzigutovo is located 6 km southwest of Bolsheustyikinskoye (the district's administrative centre) by road. Bolsheustyikinskoye is the nearest rural locality.

References 

Rural localities in Mechetlinsky District